Defence Housing Authority (DHA) is a Pakistan Army-administered real-estate developer that governs housing and municipal services for Defence neighbourhoods across Pakistan. It is the first largest residential community in Pakistan. It was constitutionalised through an act of parliament in 2002, whereas, Defence Secretary is it chairman and it is managed by Pakistan Army.

Primarily aimed to develop housing for current and retired military personnel in 1970s,  now sells most plots in its new projects to civilians while a portion of total plots is alloted to armed forces officers, families of martyrs and other employees as service benefit on installment payment plans ranging from 10 to 20 years. 
 

DHA allows the construction of houses and commercial buildings according to defined parameters, to create safe and environment friendly infrastructure. DHA has endeavored to provide an opportunity to live the innovative and modern living. Relying on the elements of strategic urban planning, development, and sustainability it has carved out its residential and commercial projects.

Localities
 DHA City
 DHA, Karachi
 DHA, Islamabad
 DHA Valley
 DHA, Lahore
 DHA, Gujranwala
 DHA, Peshawar
 DHA, Quetta
 DHA, Hyderabad
 DHA, Multan
 DHA, Bahawalpur

See also
Army Welfare Trust 
Fauji Foundation
Bahria Foundation
Shaheen Foundation
Military–industrial complex

References

External links 
 DHA Karachi official website
 DHA Peshawar official website
 DHA Lahore official website
 DHA Islamabad official website
 DHA Bahawalpur official website
 DHA Multan official website
 DHA Gujranwala official website
 DHA Quetta official website

 
Real estate companies of Pakistan
Real estate
Housing in Pakistan
Pakistan Army affiliated organizations